KTCS-FM (99.9 FM) is a radio station broadcasting a country music format. Licensed to Fort Smith, Arkansas, United States, it serves the Ft. Smith area.  The station is currently owned by Big Chief Broadcasting Company.  The station runs the Country Countdown USA with Lon Helton show on Sunday mornings from 9 am till noon.

External links

Country radio stations in the United States
TCS-FM